Lucy Thoumaian or Rossier de Visme (1890–1940) was an Armenian woman's rights and peace activist. Driven out of Armenia she helped create a school in Chigwell for orphaned Armenians. She published a manifesto for peace before she attended the Women at the Hague conference in 1915. Afterwards, she began working for the League of Nations.

Life
Thoumaian was born in Switzerland with the name Rossier de Visme.

She and her husband Reverend Professor Garabed Thoumanian were driven out of Armenia and they became exiles in Britain. There, they organised an orphanage and school at Oakhurst in Chigwell for Armenians in 1906.

In 1911, she attended the First Universal Races Congress in London which was an early attempt at anti-racism. Despite being an exile from the Ottoman Empire she had embraced the Turkish delegates as a symbol of the need to work together.

In 1914, she published a manifesto for peace whose theme was "War is man-made, it must be woman undone". She proposed that women should have weekly meetings until the dispute that caused the war was resolved.

In 1915, Thoumaian traveled to The Hague where she represented Armenia at the Women at the Hague conference. She arrived at the conference on the 25 April 1915. The day before the Armenian genocide started when hundreds of intellectuals were arrested in Armenia.

Thomanian was on the main panel at the conference. After the conference, she stayed in the Netherlands until November. She was busy circulating material, and she was desperate to get information on 30 relatives she last saw in Marsovan in Armenia.

After the war ended, she was pushed forward by the WILPF to work for a League of Nations commission. She continued to work for justices for the victims of the genocide in Armenia.

Thoumaian died in the United States of America in 1940.

References

1890 births
1940 deaths
Armenian women's rights activists
Armenian pacifists
Swiss pacifists
Swiss activists
Pacifist feminists
Swiss women activists
Women's International League for Peace and Freedom people
Swiss women's rights activists
Swiss people of Armenian descent